Atletico Potosino was a Mexican football team that played most of their years in the Mexican First Division. Was last held in the city of San Luis Potosi, Mexico. They were known by the nickname of Cachorros and played with blue uniform with two vertical stripes on the left side of about 7 cm wide yellow and white that meant gold and silver that were exploited by the Spaniards in colonial times and their shield was the water box emblem historical monument of the city.

History 
The team was founded in 1972 by the name of Pumas de la Universidad Autonoma de San Luis (UASLP-Pumas), debuting at Segunda División de México. At first it was regarded as an inferior when compared to the San Luis which had been founded in 1966 and then active in the Primera Division Mexicana.

After two seasons in Segunda Division de Mexico, the team was invited by the Federación Mexicana de Fútbol part of the Primera Division Mexicana for the season 1974–1975, with the aim of expanding the league to 20 teams, the other club was invited Unión de Curtidores, this privilege were given at the end as semi-finalists in the second division, but the name UASLP-Pumas had to be changed to Atlético Potosino because UNAM did not allow the team used the same nickname. In the 1973–1974 season, Club San Luis had dropped to the second division and Atletico Potosino had taken the place as the main team in the region.

In the 1975–1976 season the team was in serious relegation trouble and played a relegation playoff against Atlante to decide who descended. With an aggregate score of 2–1 Atletico Potosino achieved permanence and send Atlante to Segunda División.

For the 1976 season San Luis returns the maximum circuit and gives a rise to a Potosino classic. They would play two games in the 1976–1977 season, the first of which was at Week 14 ended in a 1–1 tie, while the second was in Week 33 with a score of 2–0 for the San Luis. This season both teams qualified for the playoffs but did not face each other again. In 1977 the San Luis was sold to Tampico and the city of San Luis would only have one team.

Atletico Potosino continued with outstanding seasons in the top level, reaching three liguillas. Their best season was 1978–1979, in which they finished in fifth place overall command of Alberto Guerra.

In 1983–1984 season they played another relegation playoff against Unión de Curtidores and once again were saved from relegation. But it fell disastrously in the campaign 1988–1989 season with Jesus de Anda as coach, his last match was a 4–0 defeat against the Tampico Madero

His last 3 seasons in the first division were contrasting, in the 1986–87 season they were just a point to qualify for the playoffs with a team formed by 80% by Potosinos players, including notable players such as René Isidoro García, Mauricio Lopez Victor Medina, reinforced by players Nelson Sanhueza, Chilean Luis "Cholo" Castro, the Paraguayan Eligio Torres and other prominent players. The manager in this tournament was José Camacho.

For the following season the team did not reinforce themselves leading to Jose Camacho was soon sacked, and Pedro Araya was hired, he could but he was unable to help the team to top form. Then after the Argentine Luis Grill Prieto coached the last match and saves the team from relegation after earning a tie against Correcaminos, with a goal from midfielder Jaime Leon.

In the 88–89 season, the team suffered the losses of key players coming pretty bad reinforcements as the Chilean Juan "Rapido" Rojas, and some other players who did not perform as expected, Rodolfo Villegas, Paco Uribe, Rafael Bautista among others, emerging as figure midfielder David Rangel. This caused the team to be relegated to Segunda Division.

Their last two seasons in the Liga de Ascenso went unnoticed until the owner decided to sell the franchise.

Total Numbers 

Atlético Potosino in Primera División Mexicana:

Copa Mexico:

Coaches 
 Jesus de Anda
 Angel Zubieta
 José Navarro Corona
 Jesus Silva Cabrera
 Ciro Barbosa
 Luis Grill Prieto
 Carlos Turcato
 Alberto Guerra
 Jesus Prado
 José Camacho
 Pedro Araya
 Jorge Ortega
 Ildefonso Mendoza
 Marco Antonio Martínez
 José Luis Hernández

Honours 
 Segunda División de México:
 Runner-up 1973–74

External links 

Defunct football clubs in San Luis Potosí
Liga MX teams
Ascenso MX teams